Goran Ivanišević and Michael Stich were the defending champions, but lost in the round robin.

Paul Haarhuis and Cédric Pioline won in the final 6–3, 6–4, against Pat Cash and Emilio Sánchez

Draw

Final

Group A
Standings are determined by: 1. number of wins; 2. number of matches; 3. in three-players-ties, percentage of sets won, or of games won; 4. steering-committee decision.

Group B
Standings are determined by: 1. number of wins; 2. number of matches; 3. in three-players-ties, percentage of sets won, or of games won; 4. steering-committee decision.

External links
Completed matches

Legends Under 45 Doubles